Petasina bielzi is a species of air-breathing land snail, a terrestrial pulmonate gastropod mollusc in the family Hygromiidae.

Distribution 
Distribution of this species is Eastern-Carpathian.

 Slovakia
 Ukraine

References

Bielzi
Molluscs of Europe